Maybe Baby (released in the Philippines as Sex Bomb) is a 2000 British comedy film starring Hugh Laurie and Joely Richardson. It was written and directed by Ben Elton, with Laurie directing some scenes in an uncredited role, and based upon Elton's 1999 novel, Inconceivable. A critical failure, the film did poorly at the box office, despite a cast including many of the best-known names within comedy in Britain.

Plot
Sam Bell (Hugh Laurie) and his wife Lucy (Joely Richardson) are a married couple struggling for a baby, having tried everything they can think of to improve their chances of conceiving. At the same time, Sam begins to find his job (as a commissioning editor of drama at the BBC) increasingly unfulfilling. While he resolves to write his own screenplay, he begins to suffer writer's block.

The idea dawns upon him to write about his own predicament, something to which Lucy objects strongly. He uses her diary entries to help him achieve authenticity, and the film is a success. Lucy finds out about the film and, shocked, leaves Sam. Eventually they reconcile, and at the end of the story are still trying for a baby.

It marks the second time Laurie and Richardson have starred in the same film; the first was 101 Dalmatians (although in that film they shared no scenes).

Cast
Hugh Laurie as Sam Bell
Joely Richardson as Lucy Bell
Matthew Macfadyen as Nigel
Adrian Lester as George
Yasmin Bannerman as Melinda
Joanna Lumley as Sheila
Rachael Stirling as Joanna
Dave Thompson as Dave the Comedian
Emma Thompson as Druscilla
James Purefoy as Carl Phipps
Tom Hollander as Ewan Proclaimer
Rowan Atkinson as Mr. James
Kelly Reilly as Nimnh
Dawn French as Charlene

Soundtrack
The title song "Maybe Baby" is performed by Paul McCartney and co-produced by McCartney and Jeff Lynne. "I Don't Wanna Fight", a song from Westlife's self-titled debut album, is played in the last part of the movie. Melanie C's song "Suddenly Monday" also appears on the soundtrack, alongside tracks by Roxy Music, Lene Marlin, Atomic Kitten, Elvis Costello and the Attractions, George Michael and Madness.

Laurie co-wrote and performed the humorous blues song "Sperm Test in the Morning".

Release
Maybe Baby was released in the United Kingdom on 2 June 2000. In the Philippines, the film was released as Sex Bomb on September 20, 2000.

Reception
Rotten Tomatoes reported a 46% approval rating, with an average rating of 5.1/10 based on 28 reviews. Metacritic calculated an average score of 46 out of 100 based on 11 reviews, indicating "mixed or average reviews".

When the film was released in the United Kingdom, it opened at No. 3, behind Gladiator and Final Destination.

External links

References

British romantic comedy films
2000 films
2000 independent films
2000 romantic comedy films
2000s English-language films
2000s British films
BBC Film films
British independent films
Films based on British novels
Films directed by Ben Elton
Films scored by Colin Towns
Films shot in London
Films with screenplays by Ben Elton